Rahmad (born on February 18, 1986) is an Indonesian footballer that currently plays for PSMS Medan in the Liga Indonesia Premier Division.

References

External links

1986 births
Association football defenders
Living people
Indonesian footballers
Liga 1 (Indonesia) players
Indonesian Premier Division players
Persiraja Banda Aceh players
PSMS Medan players